Matthew Lintz (born May 23, 2001) is an American actor known for playing Matty van Patten in Pixels, Henry in the AMC television series The Walking Dead and Bruno in Ms. Marvel.

Career
In 2018, Lintz played the older version of Henry in the television series, The Walking Dead. The younger version of Henry was played by Lintz's younger brother, Macsen, while his older sister, Madison, played Carol's daughter, Sophia Peletier in the first two seasons. In the same year, Lintz played Stevie Taggert in the first season of the TNT television series, The Alienist.

In November 2020, it was revealed in set photos that Lintz would be playing Bruno Carrelli in the Disney+ series Ms. Marvel'' set in the Marvel Cinematic Universe (MCU). Lintz also originally auditioned for the role of Spider-Man in the MCU.

Filmography

References

External links

2001 births
Living people
21st-century American male actors
American male film actors
American male television actors
American male child actors
People from Clinch County, Georgia
Male actors from Georgia (U.S. state)
Auburn University alumni